The Aviadvigatel PD-14 (previously known as PS-12) is a high-bypass turbofan being developed by Aviadvigatel to power the Irkut MC-21 twin-jet airliner. It is a 14 tf (30,865 lbf) thrust powerplant.

Development

In December 2009, the PD-14 was developed to be 15% more efficient than its PS-90A2 predecessor to be installed on the MS-21 and the Ilyushin Il-276.

The PD-14 was announced in early 2010 with its development cost estimated at RUB 35 billion (US$1.1 billion).
In April 2010, Aviadvigatel was expecting to start its certification procedure in 2012.
Its core was first tested on 26 November 2010.
It was displayed for the first time at the 2013 MAKS air show.

Flight tests began in 2015 on an Ilyushin Il-76. Between December 2016 and May 2017, the PD-14 operational performance and working efficiency at all altitudes and speeds were assessed on the Il-76 testbed aircraft at Gromov Flight Research Institute near Moscow. After two years exploring performance at most altitudes, airspeeds and operating modes, the first and second testing stages confirmed its basic operating parameters. A third phase of flight tests debuted in January 2018 from the GFRI Zhukovsky Airfield, conducted in co-operation with certification specialists to formally confirm the pre-certification efforts findings.

Ground tests will continue in parallel, and United Engine Corporation claims that the engine matches the performance of products from foreign competitors and surpasses them for noise and emissions.
Bird strike tests on the fan, including high-speed video and vibration measurements, were conducted together with fan blade strength tests.  The successful results are expected to reduce the time and cost of attaining full certification status.

United Engine was to deliver five PD-14s to Irkut by the end of 2018, and after Rosaviatsia certification, to start flight tests on the MC-21 in 2019 for type certification of the variant in 2021.
EASA certification is expected when it will enter series production.
In October 2018, Rosaviatsia granted certification to the PD-14, and deliveries of the first engines for two MC-21s were expected by the end of 2018. European certificate validation was planned for 2019.

In October 2021, the engine successfully passed landmark volcanic ash exposure tests. According to Anatoly Serdyukov, the thrust of the PD-14 “practically did not decrease” after the engine was exposed to the presence of the ash for 1 hour.

Design

The 1.9 m (75 in) fan has 18 titanium alloy blades, providing an 8.5:1 bypass ratio significantly improved from previous Russian engines, but below the CFM LEAP's 10:1 or the Pratt & Whitney PW1000G's 12:1 for the MC-21 from 2017.
The 3D aerodynamics shaped first high-pressure turbine stage has advanced cooling channels.
Twenty new materials were developed for the powerplant, including monocrystalline alloys for vanes, and high-strength nickel and titanium alloys for shafts and disks.

Developed from the PS-12 (an uprated PS-90A), the 122–153 kN (27,500-34,500 lbf) thrust powerplant is designed by Aviadvigatel and manufactured by the Perm Engine Company.
The two-shaft turbofan has a high-pressure core from the PS-12 with an eight-stage compressor and a two-stage turbine, and four low-pressure stages.
The high-bypass engine does not employ an exhaust mixer, fuel burn should be reduced by 10–15% from the CFM International CFM56 and it could power an upgraded Tupolev Tu-204.

Proposed derivatives
PD-8 is a derated model at 78 kN (17,500 lbf) for the Sukhoi Superjet 100 and Beriev Be-200.  As of mid-2022, a PD-8 prototype had successfully completed ground testing, and had conducted its first flight test installed on an Ilyushin Il-76 aircraft. 
PD-12V: turboshaft variant for the Mil Mi-26 heavy lift helicopter, development started in 2016, 11,500 shp (up to 14,500 shp).
PD-35:  for the CRAIC CR929, possibly for Antonov An-124, and its replacement Ilyushin Il-106 PAK VTA.

PD-35

Launched in the summer of 2016 by United Engine Corporation through Aviadvigatel and NPO Saturn, the  thrust PD-35 will be developed until 2025 for 180 billion rubles ($3 billion) including 60 billion for test benches and laboratory equipment, to power future wide-body aircraft including the Russo-Chinese CRAIC CR929.

On 19 January 2018, the Russian government awarded UEC-Aviadvigatel a ₽64.3 billion ($1.13 billion) contract to develop a PD-35-1 demonstrator 
by 2023, including wide-chord composite fan blades and fan case, a 23:1 compressor pressure ratio, ceramic matrix composites – silicon carbide-silicon carbide (SiC-SiC) and carbon-silicon carbide (C-SiC) – and advanced cooling for 1,450 °C (2,640 °F) temperatures.
It could power the Ilyushin IL-96-400, the Il-76 airlifter, Il-78 tanker and an Antonov An-124 replacement Ilyushin Il-106 PAK VTA.
A de-rated version would meet the An-124 thrust requirements.

Applications
 PD-8: Sukhoi Superjet 100, Beriev Be-200
 PD-10: Sukhoi Superjet 130
 PD-12V: Mil Mi-26
 PD-14: Irkut MC-21, Ilyushin Il-276
 PD-35 : CRAIC CR929, Ilyushin Il-96, Ilyushin Il-106 PAK VTA

Specifications

See also

References

External links

 
 
 
 

High-bypass turbofan engines
PD-14
2010s turbofan engines